Band Bast or Band-e Bast may refer to:
 Band-e Bast, Fars
 Band Bast, Larestan, Fars Province
 Band Bast, alternate name of Mazraeh-ye Bandubast, Larsetan County, Fars Province
 Band Bast, Qir and Karzin, Fars Province
 Band Bast, Hormozgan
 Agi Band Bast, Hormozgan Province